General Dodd may refer to:

Carl Dodd (Irish Army officer) (c. 1942–2018), Irish Army major general
Francis Dodd (general) (1899–1973), U.S. Army brigadier general
George A. Dodd (1852–1925), U.S. Army brigadier general

See also
General Dodds (disambiguation)